Magnus Tideman (born 9 April 1963) is a former professional tennis player from Sweden. He won 1 doubles title and achieved a career-high of World No. 43 in 1988. In singles, he reached the quarterfinals of Toulouse in 1982 (defeating Thierry Tulasne en route) and achieved a career-high ranking of World No. 100 in 1983. Tideman also defeated Manuel Orantes at the 1983 French Open.

After retiring from tennis, he became a tennis coach.

Career finals

Doubles (1 win)

External links
 
 

Swedish male tennis players
Sportspeople from Uppsala
1963 births
Living people